Quid may refer to:

 Quasi Universal Intergalactic Denomination, a proposed "space currency" created as a viral marketing campaign launched by Travelex.
 Quid, slang for the pound sterling, and the euro in Ireland.
 The Quid, a Canadian garage rock band from Winnipeg, Manitoba.
 Quid (encyclopedia), a French encyclopedia, established in 1963 by Dominique Frémy.
 Quid Inc., a private software and services company, specializing in text-based data analysis.
 Tertium quids (sometimes quids), various factions of the Democratic-Republican Party in the United States during the period 1804–1812.

See also
 Kwid (disambiguation)
 Quid pro quo